Kreuzjoch is a mountain of Bavaria in southern Germany, part of the present-day Garmisch Classic ski resort.

Alpine ski racing
For the 1936 Winter Olympics in neighboring Garmisch-Partenkirchen, it was the starting line for the downhill portion of the combined event, the first-ever alpine skiing events in the Winter Olympics. Prior to the launch of the World Cup in 1967, the downhill course was one of the venues of the rotating Arlberg-Kandahar races. In addition to hosting numerous World Cup races, Garmisch Classic was the site of the World Championships in 1978 and 2011.

References

Sources
 1936 Winter Olympics official report. pp. 289–303. 
 Garmisch Classic - official site - 
 Ski Map.org - Garmisch-Partenkirchen - 6 maps
 Alpine Ski Maps.com - Garmisch-Partenkirchen

Venues of the 1936 Winter Olympics
Olympic alpine skiing venues
Mountains of Bavaria
Mountains of the Alps